Flavobacterium defluvii is a Gram-negative and non-spore-forming bacterium from the genus of Flavobacterium which has been isolated from activated sludge from a municipal wastewater treatment plant in  Pohang in Korea.

References

 

defluvii
Bacteria described in 2007